Scopula ossicolor is a moth of the  family Geometridae. It is found in Kenya, Nigeria and Sierra Leone.

References

Moths described in 1897
ossicolor
Moths of Africa
Insects of West Africa